Phtheochroa aureopunctana is a species of moth of the family Tortricidae. It is found mainly in the Middle East: namely Turkey, Lebanon, Palestine, Iran and Syria.

References

Moths described in 1894
Phtheochroa